National Tertiary Route 324, or just Route 324 (or ) is a National Road Route of Costa Rica, located in the San José province.

Description
In San José province the route covers Puriscal canton (Mercedes Sur district), Turrubares canton (Carara district).

References

Highways in Costa Rica